This is a list of administrative regions of Burkina Faso by Human Development Index as of 2021.

References 

Burkina Faso
Human Development Index
Regions
HDI